Floetry were an English R&B duo comprising Marsha Ambrosius ("the Songstress") and Natalie Stewart ("the Floacist"). The group recorded two studio albums, one live album, and sold over 1,500,000 records worldwide. Formed in 1997, Floetry started on the performance poetry stage. They have worked with many US musicians and artists including: Jill Scott, Queen Latifah, Michael Jackson, Common, The Roots, Bilal, and more founders of Neo-Soul.

Career

Beginnings: 1994–2002
Marsha Ambrosius and Natalie Stewart first met on the basketball courts in London, England. There they quickly transitioned from rivals to friends, bonding over their love for music and poetry. The first collaboration came when Ambrosius contacted Stewart about adding poetry to the chorus of a song she was working on called 'Fantasize'. Stewart invited Ambrosius onstage to perform the song at her show a few months later. Their connection was felt all throughout the venue, with many people crying during the show. In 1997, the duo began writing music together and constantly performing in the music venues of London. After three years the duo moved to U.S., first living in Atlanta but later moving to Philadelphia where much success was found. Since moving to the U.S. in 2000, they have written for Jill Scott, Jazz of Dru Hill, Glenn Lewis (Marsha only), Bilal, and Michael Jackson, for whom Marsha penned the hit 2002 single "Butterflies".

Floetic and Floacism: 2002–03
In the year of 2002, Floetry signed with DreamWorks Records and released their debut album Floetic, which featured the singles "Floetic", "Say Yes" (released March 2003), and "Getting Late". "Say Yes" stayed on the Hot 100 billboard charts for 20 weeks, peaking at number 24 on 14 June 2003. The album was also released in the United Kingdom with additional tracks, one of which features British singer/songwriter and producer Sebastian Rogers. Their song "Where's The Love" was featured in the best-known 2003 film  Bringing Down the House. Reviewers of the album praised Floetry for their skillful writing, soulful sound infused with funk and R&B and representing the English R&B scene that was emerging.

Floetry released a live album titled Floacism in 2003. The two-disc set consisted of a CD and DVD and included the single "Wanna B Where U R" featuring rapper Mos Def.

Flo'Ology: 2004–06
The duo began creating their second studio album shortly after the release of Floacism. During summer of 2005, they began touring with the Sugar Water Festival. There they opened for Jill Scott, Erykah Badu, and Queen Latifah. Their third and final album Flo'Ology was released in November 2005. The album debuted at number seven on the US Billboard Hot 200 and number two on the Top R&B chart, and sold over 77,000 copies in its first week. The album included the single "Supastar" featuring Common.

Epilogue: 2007–14
In 2006, Marsha Ambrosius signed a solo record deal with Aftermath Entertainment. In 2007, she released a mixtape entitled, Neo Soul is Dead. After the release of the mixtape, Ambrosius parted ways with Stewart. Stewart later went on to release an extended play entitled, Spoken Soul Volume 1.

In November 2010, Stewart released her first solo album, Floetic Soul, on the Shanachie Records. In 2011, Ambrosius released her debut solo album, Late Nights & Early Mornings, on J Records. In November 2012, Stewart released her second album, Floetry Re:Birth. In March 2014, Stewart released her third album Rise of the Phoenix Mermaid. In July 2014, Ambrosius released her second album Friends & Lovers.

Reunion: 2014–16
In December 2014, Stewart reunited with Ambrosius during Ambrosius' concert and performed "Floetic" at The Clapham Grand in London. In February 2015, Stewart confirmed that duo would be touring in 2015. On 16 May 2015, Floetry reunited and performed their first show in nine years at Pepsi Funk Festival in College Park, Georgia. Despite announcing they would be recording a new album, Floetry subsequently split after the second leg of their reunion tour in August 2016.

Discography

Studio albums

Live albums

Singles

Awards
The Grammy Awards are awarded annually by the National Academy of Recording Arts and Sciences of the United States. Floetry have received five Grammy nominations.

Grammy Awards

References

External links
Floetry at Geffen Records website
Floetry Myspace

English hip hop groups
English musical duos
Contemporary R&B duos
British contemporary R&B musical groups
Musical groups from London
British soul musical groups
Black British musical groups
DreamWorks Records artists
Geffen Records artists
Women hip hop groups
Musical groups established in 1997
Musical groups disestablished in 2007
English girl groups
British hip hop girl groups
Hip hop duos
British R&B girl groups
Female musical duos
Third British Invasion artists